Richard Alfred William Heppolette (born 8 April 1949) is an Indian-born English former professional footballer. Born in Bhusawal, he appeared with multiple clubs including Preston North End, Leyton Orient, Crystal Palace, Chesterfield, Peterborough United and Hong Kong club Eastern AA. Heppolette had moved to England with his family when he was an infant. He was among the first Asian players of Indian descent to play in the Football League.

References

1949 births
English footballers
English Football League players
Association football midfielders
Preston North End F.C. players
Leyton Orient F.C. players
Crystal Palace F.C. players
Peterborough United F.C. players
Chesterfield F.C. players
Eastern Sports Club footballers
English expatriate footballers
Living people
Expatriate footballers in Hong Kong
People from Bhusawal
Footballers from Maharashtra
Anglo-Indian people
Indian emigrants to the United Kingdom
English people of Indian descent
British people of Anglo-Indian descent
British sportspeople of Indian descent
British Asian footballers